Vaziri may refer to:
 Vaziri, Hormozgan
 Vaziri, Yazd